Smodicum texanum is a species of beetle in the family Cerambycidae. It was described by Knull in 1966.

References

Cerambycinae
Beetles described in 1966